Ablington may refer to two places in England:

Ablington, Gloucestershire
Ablington, Wiltshire